Roman Nováček (born 5 July 1969) is a Czech judoka.

Achievements

References

1969 births
Living people
Czech male judoka
Judoka at the 1996 Summer Olympics
Olympic judoka of the Czech Republic
Place of birth missing (living people)